The participation of Brunei in the ABU TV Song Festival has occurred four times since the inaugural ABU TV Song Festival began in 2012. Since their début in 2013, the Brunei entry has been organised by the national broadcaster Radio Televisyen Brunei (RTB).

History

2013
RTB made their debut in the ABU TV Song Festivals at the 2013 festival, in Hanoi, Vietnam. On 3 September 2013 it was announced that the singer Qeez Idrus would represent Brunei on their debut, she would sing "Salahkak Aku". The song is a cover of "Salahkak Aku" which was originally released by Fakhrul Razi.

2014
On 3 June 2014 Radio Televisyen Brunei confirmed that they would participate in the 2014 festival in Macau.  On 1 September 2014 it was revealed that Brunei would be represented by Md. Hawzan Bin Hj with the song "Awg Madial".

2015
On 25 June 2015 it was confirmed that Brunei would not participate in the 2015 festival in Turkey.

Participation overview

See also 
 Brunei in the ABU Radio Song Festival

References 

Countries at the ABU Song Festival